The Nokia 6230 is a mobile phone based on the Nokia Series 40 platform. It was announced on 28 October 2003 and released in February 2004.

The 6230 is business-styled but it does feature a VGA resolution digital camera, video camera, a music player and expandable memory.

Cingular Wireless was the primary GSM carrier that offered the Nokia 6230b in the United States. Other companies such as Cincinnati Bell, Simmetry Communications, Viaero Wireless and Telcel also offered this model.

Features
It features a 16-bit TFT color screen with a resolution of 128×128 pixels, a VGA camera that can record video clips in H.263 (SubQCIF) format at 128×96 pixels at 15 FPS, built-in Bluetooth wireless technology, FM radio (when a wired headset is attached to the Pop-Port interface to act as an antenna), and playback of 3GP video/audio at up to 30 FPS and MP3, AAC and AMR audio. It is also EGPRS (EDGE) capable of speeds up to 220 kbit/s. In addition, it has changeable Xpress-on covers available for purchase.

It uses an Extended Li-Ion Battery of 850 mAh. The 6230 accepts MMC memory cards up to 4 GB in capacity formatted in FAT32 or FAT16 file systems (supported by later firmware releases) on which multimedia files and data can be stored. SD cards are not supported. It operates on either GSM 900/1800/1900 MHz (Nokia 6230 RH-12), or GSM 850/1800/1900 MHz (Nokia 6230b RH-28) for the North American market.

It was the first non-smartphone from Nokia with an expandable memory card slot and was usually supplied with a 32MB MMC Card. The first non-smartphone with expandable memory was the Siemens SL45, introduced in 2001.

Nokia 6230i

In February 28, 2005 Nokia released an updated 6230i model (RM-72) which includes a 1.3-Megapixel camera instead of a 0.3, 208×208 screen resolution (65,536 colours), a slightly larger display (1.7 inches), a raised selection button in the midst of the scroll key, and a modern redesigned menu.

It is also standard UMS (USB mass storage device class) compliant, i.e. no proprietary drivers are required to transfer data to and from the device's memory card. It weighs 99 g (including battery BL-5C) and the dimensions are 103 mm x 44 mm x 20 mm, 76 cc.

The BL-5C battery that comes standard with it will last about 150–300 hours, depending on usage.

This model was available only in GSM 900/1800/1900 MHz; Nokia did not release an 850 MHz version for the North American market.

The next model in the 623x series is the 3G GSM/WCDMA Nokia 6233.

Appearance
The graphical user interface was overhauled, and many of the icons featured on the 6230i are the same as those now used uniformly across almost all new Nokia phones. Notably, the menu icons on the Nokia 6230i are animated, as opposed to the previous model which were static.

The phone has seven built-in themes ('Basic', 'Circle', 'DotSpace', 'Dots2', 'Microdots', 'Waves', and 'Window'), and users can download more.   In addition, users may customise the color of the borders, and the battery and signal bars.

The operating system does run more slowly than on the 6230, possibly due to the increased processor drain of the higher resolution screen. Nokia also removed several options from menus, such as: brightness control, and the ability to automatically overwrite text messages in the Inbox/Sent Folders.  These changes have brought widespread complaints.

Security
The phone can automatically lock after a set time, starting from five seconds of no activity. In addition to the auto-lock, users can lock with a 'keyguard', which prevents unauthorised use of the phone. The code it uses is the standard security code. If the user gets this code wrong five times, the phone is 'locked out', whereby no-one can gain access for five minutes.

Users can choose to protect their phone by enabling a PIN. When enabled, the phone will prompt users to type the PIN, and on success the phone will grant access. Users can also protect their SIM card, which is standard phone practice.

Organization
The Nokia 6230i has organizing software, such as: calendar, alarm clock, to-do list, notes, wallet. The 'Wallet' is a password protected area where users can store bank card details, tickets, receipts, and personal notes. Users can set different profiles within the 'Wallet', for example 'work' or 'personal', whereby different card details, for example, can be stored. There is an e-mail application, but it must be set up by the user's mobile phone network.

Phone book
Further to storing mobile numbers, users can add e-mail addresses, home-phone numbers, an image (shows when contact calls), PTT addresses, postal addresses, web addresses, notes, and user identification.

Contacts can be put into groups, for example 'work colleagues' but such groups do not appear to be usable for text messaging. There is a Distribution List feature under Messages where users can send group SMS (Only available with the 6210).

Users can add sixteen voice commands (also known as 'Voice tags'), whereby users can say a contact's name and the phone will automatically call that contact (only if the user individually sets a voice per person).

Connectivity
The Nokia 6230i is GPRS enabled. It features a GPRS Class 10 connectivity at up to 48 kbit/s. It is also EDGE enabled at Class 10 offering speeds up to 236.8 kbit/s. It also has an infrared port and is Bluetooth enabled, making it one of the few phones to feature both infrared and Bluetooth.

Media

The Nokia 6230i features an integrated music player which can play MP3 and AAC (Advanced Audio Coding) format files. The music player has an inbuilt Graphic Equalizer and the ability to create and save custom equalizers. Up to seven different equalizer settings are available. The phone plays exceptionally high quality audio. The Music Players also includes the ability to play music via Bluetooth. It included the song "Strange Transmissions" by Norah Jones & The Peter Malick Group. It also includes a Media Player to play video files in 3GP formats. The video recording is done in 3GP format as well. The phone also includes a Radio (headset is required to be connected) in which 20  radio channels can be saved. Auto tuning of frequencies can be done automatically. The Nokia 6230i also features a Voice Recorder with up to 60 minutes of voice recording.

Push to talk (PTT)
The Nokia 6230i features Push to talk (PTT). Push to talk (PTT) functions as a two-way radio. The PTT option is available only if enabled by the service provider.

Extra applications

The phone also has a basic calculator, countdown timer, and a stopwatch, which has two settings: 'Split timing' and 'Lap timing', both allow users to save and name their times. It also includes integrated "Message counter" which counts the number of messages sent and received. Another application called "GPRS data counter" shows the data received and sent during each session and also for all sessions combined. "GPRS connection timer" registers the time for each session. The phone also supports speed dials, up to nine numbers can be assigned for speed dialing.

Collection folder
Users can download new applications (through WAP) which are stored in a folder named 'Collections'. However, Nokia included three applications. 'World clock II' allows users to view time zones across the world; the graphical user interface highlights the current time zone yellow, and allows users to navigate, left or right, across the world, showing the city at the centre of the time zone. 'Converter II' is an excellent application for converting anything from currencies, grams, pounds, and so forth. Through the 'Options', users can customise the conversions to suit their needs; this is especially useful when currencies alter in value. The final application is a translation tool ('Translator'). For example, if a search query is 'help', then the application will show five translations (English, French, German, Spanish, and Italian). The problem is that the phone is limited to 2 MB of applications regardless the size of the Multimedia Card or the internal memory.

Bugs
A few bugs have been reported with this phone:

When using a Bluetooth audio device together with voice tags, the ringing tone is always ascending, even when ascending is not selected.  The only temporary solution is to reset the phone, although the problem comes back when using Bluetooth and voice tags again.  This bug is still present in the latest firmware.
Sometimes, the display lights up for a few seconds and then goes out again. This happens when the phone battery depletes by one "bar", which may be seen as pointless as the lights coming on would increase drain on the battery. This was meant to be an early warning for low battery.
Sometimes, for no apparent reason, an image or video clip is copied.
In the music player, when selecting an entry in the playlist at a position higher than 255 the player has a wrap around bug and will play the entry 255 positions before the one selected. For example, if entry 260 is selected entry 5 will be played, if entry 300 is selected entry 45 will be played. This is caused by the music player using an unsigned 8-bit integer to store the selected track. This bug is present on the 6230, 6230i and early versions of the 6233. The work around is use the playlist to see the entry number, then go back to the currently playing entry and type in the number of the entry you want (jump to).
On newer firmware version of the 6230i, the camera is unable to process images that are bigger than 786 KB. This can be experienced when taking pictures at top quality setting in 1280x1024 mode of scenes with lots of fine details, like the leaves on a tree. You will sometimes get a message like "Unable to save" because the image processor in the camera module does not have enough memory to create the compressed JPEG file from the image sensor data.
While the 6230i is able to use a 4 GB MMC card (provided it is formatted with FAT16) it will fail to enter mass storage mode when a 4 GB MMC is present.
On older versions of the BL-5C battery, the internal chemicals would leak/react while charging for long periods of time. While this is rare, Nokia offered a free replacement.
When the phone is left on for extended periods, the ringer volume is set to low, regardless of the setting.

Reception
British review site S21 gave the phone 3 stars out of 5. It said that the phone is highly recommended and a "significant improvement" over the Nokia 6220, but criticised its poor quality screen.

See also 
 List of Nokia products
 Nokia 6233

References

External links
 Nokia 6230 Product Page
 Nokia 6230i Product Page

Reviews, videos and photos
 Nokia 6230 - Review by Mobile Review, 6230i
 Nokia 6230 - Review by MobileBurn, 6230i
 Nokia 6230 - Review by GSM Arena, 6230i

Mobile phones introduced in 2004
6230
Mobile phones with infrared transmitter